Frades de la Sierra is a village and municipality in the province of Salamanca, western Spain, part of the autonomous community of Castile and León.

Geography

Economy
The basis of the economy is agriculture.

Culture
It is the birthplace of Spanish poet José María Gabriel y Galán.

References

Municipalities in the Province of Salamanca